Dimethylaminopropionylphenothiazine or 10-(alpha-dimethylaminopropionyl)phenothiazine  is an antispasmodic.

References 

Phenothiazines
Acetamides